Chappell Peak is a peak,  high, standing  south of Schoeck Peak on the south side of the Enterprise Hills, overlooking the head of Horseshoe Valley in the Heritage Range. It was mapped by the United States Geological Survey from surveys and from U.S. Navy air photos, 1961–66, and named by the Advisory Committee on Antarctic Names for Richard L. Chappell, scientific aide at Little America V Station in 1957.

See also
 Mountains in Antarctica

References 

Mountains of Ellsworth Land